Gregory Buck Kinnear (born June 17, 1963) is an American actor. He was nominated for an Academy Award for Best Supporting Actor for his role in As Good as It Gets (1997).

Kinnear has appeared in many popular films, including Sabrina (1995), You've Got Mail (1998), Nurse Betty (2000), Someone like You (2001), We Were Soldiers, Auto Focus (both 2002), Stuck on You (2003), Robots (2005), Little Miss Sunshine, Invincible (both 2006), Green Zone, The Last Song (both 2010), Heaven Is for Real (2014), Misbehaviour (2020) and television roles, such as Friends, Talk Soup, Modern Family, House of Cards, Rake, and the miniseries The Stand (2020). Kinnear portrayed John F. Kennedy in The Kennedys (2011), and Joe Biden in Confirmation (2016).

Early life
Kinnear was born on June 17, 1963, in Logansport, Indiana, to Suzanne (née Buck), a homemaker, and Edward Kinnear, a career diplomat who worked for the US State Department. He has two older brothers, James (born 1957) and Steven (born 1959). He is of Scottish-Irish descent. Kinnear grew up a "Foreign Service brat", having moved around frequently, from Beirut to Athens. While a student at the American Community Schools in Athens, Kinnear first ventured into the role of talk show host with his radio show School Daze With Greg Kinnear. Returning to the United States for a university education, he attended the University of Arizona, graduating in 1985 with a degree in broadcast journalism. While there, he was a member of the Alpha Tau Omega fraternity.

Career

Kinnear hosted a short-lived game show, College Mad House, which was spun off from the kids' show Fun House. He became the creator, co-executive producer and host of Best of the Worst, which aired from 1991 to 1992. In 1991, Kinnear became the first host of Talk Soup, which he hosted until 1995, when he left the show for the NBC late-night talk show Later with Greg Kinnear (1994).

After his film debut, Blankman, Kinnear won the part of David Larrabee in Sydney Pollack's 1995 remake of Billy Wilder's 1954 classic Sabrina. He played the lead role in the 1996 comedy Dear God. In 1997, he was cast in James L. Brooks' comedy-drama As Good as It Gets, and received a nomination for the Academy Award for Best Supporting Actor. He also starred in A Smile Like Yours with Lauren Holly, as part of a couple trying to have a baby. His next film was the popular You've Got Mail as Kathleen's (Meg Ryan) significant other. Other films are Mystery Men, Nurse Betty, Loser, The Gift and Someone Like You. Kinnear often alternated roles, often playing good guys like a righteous principal in The Gift or a gay painter in As Good as It Gets, to bad guys such as a sleazy college professor in Loser, a womanizer in Someone Like You as well as Sabrina and an egotistical soap opera star in Nurse Betty.

In 2002 Kinnear starred in Auto Focus about the life and murder of actor Bob Crane.  Kinnear portrayed Crane.  In 2003, he starred in the comedy Stuck On You, with Matt Damon as a conjoined twin who pursues his dream of becoming a Hollywood actor in spite of his joined brother's desire for a different kind of life. In 2005, he starred in the black comedy The Matador with Pierce Brosnan and voiced Phineas T. Ratchet in the computer-animated film Robots. Kinnear co-starred with Steve Carell in the Oscar-winning comedy-drama Little Miss Sunshine in 2006, and with Mark Wahlberg in Invincible, based on the true story of a bartender who tries out for the Philadelphia Eagles football team. He also appeared in Fast Food Nation, playing a fast food executive who discovers secrets about his company. In 2008, he starred in Flash of Genius, a docudrama about Robert Kearns who invented the intermittent windshield wiper.  His portrayal of then-Major Bruce P. Crandall in 2002's We Were Soldiers brought public attention to Crandall's heroism during the 1965 Battle of Ia Drang. (On February 26, 2007, Crandall was awarded the Medal of Honor by President Bush.) In Baby Mama Kinnear played Rob, a local smoothie shop owner and the romantic interest of Kate (Tina Fey).

In 2010, he starred as the estranged father of Miley Cyrus' character in The Last Song. In 2011, Kinnear starred in the miniseries The Kennedys playing the lead role as John F. Kennedy. It was originally planned to air on the History Channel; however, it was announced in January 2011 that the miniseries had been pulled from that network. It was subsequently picked up by ReelzChannel and first aired on April 3, 2011. Kinnear played a famous novelist in Josh Boone's directorial debut film Stuck in Love, which followed his relationships with his former wife (Jennifer Connelly) and teenage children.

On March 9, 2023 Netflix announced that Kinnear will guest star in Part 2 of Season 4 of You as Tom Lockwood, the father of Joe Goldberg’s (Penn Badgley) latest love interest, Kate Galvin (Charlotte Ritchie).

Personal life
On May 1, 1999, Kinnear married Helen Labdon, a retired British glamour model. They have three daughters.

Filmography

Film

Television

Theatre

Awards and nominations

References

External links 

Greg interview on WHO.com 

1963 births
Living people
Male actors from Indiana
American game show hosts
American male film actors
American male television actors
American television personalities
Male television personalities
American television talk show hosts
Late night television talk show hosts
Outstanding Performance by a Cast in a Motion Picture Screen Actors Guild Award winners
People from Logansport, Indiana
University of Arizona alumni
American people of Scotch-Irish descent
20th-century American male actors
21st-century American male actors
American expatriates in Lebanon
American expatriates in Greece